Nigg may refer to:

Places
 Nigg, Aberdeen, Scotland
 Nigg, Highland, Scotland
 Nigg Rock, Antarctica

People
 Joel Nigg, American psychologist
 Joseph Nigg, Austrian painter
 Killing of Michael Nigg
 Serge Nigg, French composer

Other uses
 Nigg Stone, a Pictish carved stone in Easter Ross

See also
 
 NIG (disambiguation)
 Nigger and nigga, related racial slurs against black people